Published in 1997, Country of the Blind is Christopher Brookmyre's second novel. Following on from the adventures in Quite Ugly One Morning, the storyline fast forwards to find Parlabane living in domestic bliss and about to get hitched. As part of the engagement package, he has promised his soon-to-be-missus that he'll give up the more dangerous, dodgy and downright illegal parts of his investigative journalism career.

Plot summary

Set against the mounting dissatisfaction at the ineffective and over self-indulgent Tory government of John Major, all hell breaks loose when conservative tabloid media mogul Roland Voss is found murdered in his country house in Scotland.

Next to Voss's body is that of his murdered wife, while their two slain bodyguards lie outside their room. The culprits seem obvious: the burglars caught fleeing the scene covered in blood and almost immediately four men are arrested for the crime, including former burglar Thomas McInnes, his son Paul and a very strange guy who likes to be known as Spammy.

However, if it's really that obvious, why did  McInnes pay a visit to his Edinburgh lawyer a few days before the crime took place, and what are the secret contents of the envelope he left with her?

When the lawyer, Nicole Carrow, turns up at the Police station demanding to see her client, announcing under the glare of intense media attention claiming to have a letter that proves her client's innocence, the last thing she expects is have an attempt made on her life within hours.

1997 British novels
Novels by Christopher Brookmyre
Novels set in Scotland
Abacus books